Gareh Choqa (also Romanized as Gareh Choqā and Gareh Cheqā; also known as Gara Chag, Garā Choqā, Gareh Chegā, Qara Chaqa, and Qareh Chāk) is a village in Khezel-e Sharqi Rural District, Khezel District, Nahavand County, Hamadan Province, Iran. At the 2006 census, its population was 558, in 144 families.

References 

Populated places in Nahavand County